Malaysia competed at the 2016 Winter Youth Olympics in Lillehammer, Norway from 12 to 21 February 2016. The country made its debut in the Winter Olympics. The Malaysian team consisted of one figure skater and two officials.

Figure skating

Malaysia had qualified one figure skater.  

Boys

Mixed NOC team trophy

See also
Malaysia at the 2016 Summer Olympics

References

2016 in Malaysian sport
Nations at the 2016 Winter Youth Olympics
Malaysia at the Youth Olympics